Dancing with Myself is an American dance competition television series that premiered on NBC on May 31, 2022. The series is hosted by Camille Kostek.

Production
On December 14, 2021, it was announced that NBC had ordered the series with Shakira as the star and executive producer. On March 15, 2022, it was announced that Camille Kostek would host the series and that Shaquille O'Neal and Liza Koshy would join Shakira as creators of the series. On March 15, 2022, O'Neal was replaced by Nick Jonas due to technical difficulties.

The series premiered on May 31, 2022.

Format
Shakira, Koshy, and Jonas are described as "creators" rather than "judges" or "coaches."

Each show features 12 contestants competing for a $25,000 prize. Each episode features six rounds of competition; in each round, all contestants dance to the same song. The rounds are:
All Eyes On You: One creator demonstrates a series of dance moves. Each contestant must then perform those moves solo. The top eight vote-getters automatically advance, while creators save two of the remaining contestants.
Freestyle Battle Round: The remaining 10 contestants compete, in pairs of two, in a freestyle battle. The audience chooses a winner from each battle; the creators save three of the losing contestants.
The Dance Along: The eight contestants are divided into two groups of four, and must perform choreography presented by a special celebrity guest. The audience chooses one group to move on; the creators save two contestants from the losing group.
Duo Collabs: The six remaining dancers are split into three pairs and work together to perform a dance incorporating moves presented by the creators. The audience selects one pair to advance, while the creators can save any two contestants from the losing pairs.
The Shake-Up: The four remaining contestants all dance at the same time as they're faced with a different twist ("Shake-Up") each episode, such as dancing with a prop or using an iconic dance move in their performance. The audience will then select the two finalists.
Be the Creator: The final two must each perform a dance they choreographed at home. The audience will vote for the winner.

Episodes

Reception

References

External links

2020s American reality television series
2022 American television series debuts
Dance competition television shows
English-language television shows
NBC original programming
Television series by Universal Television